The Syrian national junior handball team is the national under–20 handball team of Syria. Controlled by the Syrian Arab Handball Federation that is an affiliate of the International Handball Federation IHF as well as a member of the AHF.

Tournament  record

Asian Championship 
 Champions   Runners up   Third place   Fourth place
Red border color indicates tournament was held on home soil.

See also
Syria men's national handball team

References

Handball in Syria
Men's national junior handball teams
Handball